These are the Billboard magazine R&B albums that reached number-one in 1970.

Chart history

See also
1970 in music
R&B number-one hits of 1970 (USA)
United States RandB albums

1970